Organized Noize is an American production team from Atlanta, Georgia composed of Rico Wade, Ray Murray and Sleepy Brown.

History 
Among the hit records they have worked on include TLC's "Waterfalls", En Vogue's "Don't Let Go (Love)", and Ludacris' "Saturday (Oooh! Ooooh!)". They are most notable for producing a large amount of material for Outkast (including all of Southernplayalisticadillacmuzik and "So Fresh, So Clean" from Stankonia) and Goodie Mob (including all of Soul Food and "They Don't Dance No Mo" from Still Standing). Both groups are part of Organized Noize's Dungeon Family collective, which also includes Slimm Cutta Calhoun and Joi, among others. In an interview with Billboard, Big Boi of Outkast explained that Organized Noize helped them early on in the music business, saying, "They were our big brothers, and they did a production deal with LaFace Records. They were the ones that gave us our first shot and we been doing music with them since the beginning."

They also contributed on the soundtrack of the 1996 critically acclaimed heist film Set It Off. In 2006, they contributed additional music to the film Miami Vice. In 2010 they produced several songs on the critically acclaimed Island/Def Jam solo debut from Big Boi titled Sir Lucious Left Foot: The Son of Chico Dusty. In 2011, they produced the album Nappy Dot Org for Nappy Roots.

The documentary feature The Art of Organized Noize premiered on Netflix on March 22, 2016. The documentary, directed by Quincy Jones III, details the formation of the group, who met through Tionne Watkins of TLC, and the early days of their Dungeon Family collective.

On May 5, 2017, Organized Noize released an eponymous, seven-song EP, which had been in production for over 20 years. Ahead of the official EP release, the track "Kush" was released on April 20, 2017. The project was generally well-received, with Cult MTL writer Mr. Wavvy calling it "an enjoyable listen for any fans of the original Dungeon Family/Dirty South movement."

Rico Wade is the cousin of Grammy winning rapper Future.

Impact 

Organized Noize are credited with jumpstarting the rise of Southern hip-hop in the early-to-mid 1990s. The group has been described as being, "the...production team behind some of the greatest songs ever," and "one of the most respected production teams in rap history," by NPR and Spin respectively. Billboard has stated that Organized Noize "pioneered the Dirty South sound."

Production discography

Studio albums

References

External links 
 Official Site
 
 Organized Noize on Twitter

Southern hip hop groups
American hip hop record producers
Dungeon Family members
Record production teams